Vido is a surname. Notable people with the surname include:

Giorgio Vido (born 1941), Italian politician
Luca Vido (born 1997), Italian footballer
Marcelo Vido (born 1959), Brazilian former basketball player

See also
Vido

Alfredo De Vido
Julio de Vido